Fortunate Chidzivo (born 16 March 1987) is a Zimbabwean long distance runner. She competed in the women's marathon at the 2017 World Championships in Athletics.

In 2019, she represented Zimbabwe at the 2019 African Games held in Rabat, Morocco. She competed in the women's half marathon and she finished in 6th place with a time of 1:13:47. In 2020, she competed in the women's half marathon at the 2020 World Athletics Half Marathon Championships held in Gdynia, Poland, where she improved her national record.

References

External links

1987 births
Living people
Zimbabwean female long-distance runners
Zimbabwean female marathon runners
World Athletics Championships athletes for Zimbabwe
Place of birth missing (living people)
Athletes (track and field) at the 2019 African Games
African Games competitors for Zimbabwe